The Old Brick Reformed Church began in Marlboro Township, New Jersey 1699. Most of the original families of the church originally came from Long Island. Originally the services were conducted in Dutch by Ministers who came from Brooklyn on a rotating schedule.  The rotating schedule continued for a number of years until the Marlboro Reformed Dutch Church formed in 1709, originally as the "Freehold and Middletown United Church," with Reverend Joseph Morgan as the first pastor.

The Dutch language was continued until 1764.

The first congregation church was located near "Hendrickson's Hill" in the old village of Marlboro. The current church and burial ground is located on Route 520; it was begun in 1731 but in 1826 was considered too small and was replaced. In 1869, the congregation constructed a chapel in the village of Marlboro. That building was sold in 1969.

During a consistory meeting, the current pastor, Reverend George Kaden, announced he had submitted his retirement papers with the denomination and would be leaving the pulpit June 2021.

See also
Holmdel Dutch Reformed Church

References

External links 
 

Reformed Church in America churches in New Jersey
Former Dutch Reformed churches in the United States
Marlboro Township, New Jersey
Former churches in New Jersey
1699 establishments in New Jersey